Chorigyne is a genus of plants first described as a genus in 1989. All the known species are native to Costa Rica and Panama.

 Species
 Chorigyne cylindrica R.Erikss. - Costa Rica + Panama
 Chorigyne densiflora R.Erikss. - Panama
 Chorigyne ensiformis (Hook.f.) R.Erikss. - Costa Rica + Panama
 Chorigyne paucinervis R.Erikss. - Panama
 Chorigyne pendula (Hammel) R.Erikss. - Costa Rica + Panama
 Chorigyne pterophylla R.Erikss. - Costa Rica + Panama
 Chorigyne tumescens R.Erikss. - Panama

References

Cyclanthaceae
Pandanales genera